Martin Petzoldt (13 April 1946 – 13 March 2015) was a German Lutheran theologian, Bach scholar and academic teacher.

Career 

Petzoldt was born in Rabenstein. He was a member of the  under Rudolf Mauersberger. and attended the  He studied theology at the University of Leipzig, graduating in 1969. He was promoted there in 1976 and achieved his habilitation in 1985.

In 1973 he was ordained minister of the Lutheran Church of Saxony. He taught at the University of Leipzig, from 1986 as docent, from 1992 as a professor of systematic theology with a focus on ethics. From 1995 to 2009 he was also  (university preacher). In that function, he was engaged in the discussions and decisions around the new Paulinum, replacing the former demolished university church . He was professor emeritus in 2011.

For the Carus-Verlag, Petzoldt edited a facsimile edition of the seven volumes of libretti of works by Bach which were published between 1724 and 1749, including the Christmas Oratorio.

In 1998 he was awarded the Cross of the Order of Merit of the Federal Republic of Germany. In 2012 he was diagnosed with leukemia. He died in Leipzig.

Selected publications 

 Liturgische und theologische Aspekte zu den Texten der frühesten Kantaten, in Christoph Wolff (ed.): Die Welt der Bach Kantaten , vol. 1 (Stuttgart and Kassell: Bärenreiter, 1996), 119–34.
 Bachstätten. Ein Reiseführer zu Johann Sebastian Bach. Insel, Frankfurt, 2000. 
 Chronicle of the University Church of St Paul (1240–1968)
 Liturgy and Music in Leipzig’s Main Churches 2013

References

External links 

 
 
 Gespräch über J. S. Bachs Passionen (YouTube Video), Martin Petzoldt, Christoph Wolff, Ton Koopman and Peter Wollny
 Prof. Dr. Martin Petzoldt University of Leipzig
 Foundation Mourns Loss of Prof. Dr. Martin Petzoldt Johann Sebastian Bach Stiftung 16 March 2015
 In memoriam Bachakademie 

20th-century German theologians
21st-century German theologians
Systematic theologians
Academic staff of Leipzig University
Recipients of the Cross of the Order of Merit of the Federal Republic of Germany
1946 births
2015 deaths